Hydrovatus subrotundatus, is a species of predaceous diving beetle found in India, Bangladesh, Myanmar, Nepal, Sri Lanka, China, Indonesia, Laos, Philippines, Singapore, Thailand, Vietnam and Australian region.

Body broad and oval. The lateral margin between the elytra and epipleura is clearly visible from above. Clypeus with a distinct front margin.

References 

Dytiscidae
Insects of Sri Lanka
Insects described in 1859